The East Barito languages are a group of a dozen Dayak (Austronesian) languages of Borneo, Indonesia, and most notably Malagasy, the national language of Madagascar. They are named after the Barito River located in South Kalimantan, Indonesia. 

The languages are,

Central–South
Dusun Deyah
South: Dusun Malang, Dusun Witu, Ma'anyan, Paku
Malagasy (incl. Bushi on Mayotte)
North: Lawangan, Tawoyan

Several of the languages are named 'Dusun' because they are spoken by the Dusun people; they are not to be confused with the Dusunic languages, which are also spoken by the Dusun but belong to a different branch of Malayo-Polynesian.

References
Blust, Robert. 2006. 'The linguistic macrohistory of the Philippines'. In Liao & Rubino, eds, Current Issues in Philippine Linguistics and Anthropology. pp 31–68.

 
Barito languages